The Wolfegger Kabinett is a large private collection of mostly German graphics from the 15th and 16th century. The collection is owned by the house of Waldburg-Wolfegg and hosted in Schloss Wolfegg. Among its most famous pieces were the Waldseemüller map, the Mittelalterliches Hausbuch and the Kleiner Klebeband, all of which were sold in the early 21st century though.

References

 Christoph Trepesch: Augsburger Altmeister. Arsprototo, issue 4/2011
 Michael Roth: Ein Bild von einem Mann. Arsprototo, issue 4/2011
 Lisa Zeitz: Großer Kleiner Klebeband. Arsprototo, issue 4/2011

German art
Private collections in Germany